David Colmer (Adelaide, 1960) is an Australian writer and translator, mainly of Dutch-language literature. He translates novels, poetry and children’s literature and is the current English translator of Gerbrand Bakker, Dimitri Verhulst, Annie M.G. Schmidt, and Nachoem M. Wijnberg. Colmer's poetry translations include selections of the work of Hugo Claus, Anna Enquist, Cees Nooteboom, Ramsey Nasr and Paul van Ostaijen.

Awards and nominations
 2021 James Brockway Prize for his translations of Dutch-language poetry
 2014	Shortlisted for the PEN Award for Poetry in Translation for Even Now, selected poems of Hugo Claus
 2014 	Shortlisted for the International Dublin Literary Award, with Gerbrand Bakker, for The Detour
 2013	Vondel Prize for Dimitri Verhulst’s The Misfortunates
 2013	Independent Foreign Fiction Prize, with Gerbrand Bakker, for The Detour
 2012 The Dutch Foundation for Literature’s Translation Prize for translations from Dutch
 2011	Shortlisted for the Popescu Prize for Heavenly Life, selected poems of Ramsey Nasr
 2010 	International Dublin Literary Award, with Gerbrand Bakker, for The Twin
 2010	Shortlisted, with Gerbrand Bakker, for the Best Translated Book Award for The Twin
 2009	NSW Premier's Translation Prize and the PEN Trophy (biennial prize for a body of work)
 2009	Shortlisted for the Oxford-Weidenfeld Translation Prize for The Twin
 2007-2011 	David Reid Poetry Translation Prize (four times)

Selection of translated titles
 Gerbrand Bakker: The Detour (2012); The Twin (2008)
 Hugo Claus: Even Now (2013, selected poems)
 Adriaan van Dis: Repatriated (2008, novel)
 Anna Enquist: The Fire was Here (2003, selected poems)
 Gummbah: Meanwhile, Between Two Eternities of Darkness (2013, a selection of the cartoons, revised and updated edition)
 Willem Frederik Hermans: An Untouched House (2018, Het behouden huis)
 Willem Frederik Hermans: A Guardian Angel Recalls (2021, Herinneringen van een engelbewaarder)
 Cees Nooteboom: Self-portrait of an Other (2011, prose poems)
 Ramsey Nasr: Heavenly Life (2010, selected poems)
 Martinus Nijhoff: Awater (2010)
 Willem Jan Otten: The Portrait (2009, novel)
 Annie M.G. Schmidt: Jip and Janneke (2008); A Pond Full of Ink (2011, a selection of her children’s poems); Tow-Truck Pluck  (2011, Pluk van de Petteflet)
 Paul van Ostaijen: Occupied City (2016, Bezette stad)
 Dimitri Verhulst:  Problemski Hotel (2005, novel), (2009, novel); The Misfortunates (2012, novel)
 Menno Wigman: Window-cleaner Sees Paintings (2016, selected poems)
 Nachoem M. Wijnberg: Advance Payment (2013, selected poems)

References
 

1960 births
Living people
Australian translators
Dutch–English translators